Wanderer of the Wasteland is a 1924 American silent Western film directed by Irvin Willat and starring Jack Holt, Noah Beery, and Billie Dove. It was the second feature film to be photographed entirely in two-tone Technicolor.

Plot
The film is based on Zane Grey's 1923 novel of two brothers, one an honest cowpoke, the other a gambler. When Adam Larey (Jack Holt) confronts his younger brother Guerd (James Mason) about his gambling addiction, the latter is accidentally shot. A distraught Adam, believing he has killed his own brother, flees into the desert. He later learns that Guerd was merely wounded and returns to the loving arms of beautiful Ruth Virey (Billie Dove).

Cast
 Jack Holt as Adam Larey
 Noah Beery as Dismukes
 George Irving as Mr. Roderick Virey
 Kathlyn Williams as Magdalene Virey
 Billie Dove as Ruth Virey
 Jim Mason as Guerd Larey (credited as James Mason)
 Richard Neill as Collishaw (credited as Richard R. Neill)
 James Gordon as Alex MacKay
 William A. Carroll as Merryvale (credited as William Carroll)
 Willard Cooley as Camp Doctor

Production
Paramount Pictures decided to make a picture entirely in Technicolor (an early version known as Process 2) following the success of the Technicolor sequences in the film The Ten Commandments (1923) and director Irvin Willat's own Heritage of the Desert (1924). Production began on January 24, 1924, and wrapped on March 9. Location shooting for the film included setting up "tent cities" in remote parts of Arizona, Nevada and California, and the production crew worked without being able to watch dailies.

Preservation status
The film is now considered to be a lost film. An original cemented Technicolor print survived into the 1960s in the hands of the film's director, Irvin Willat, who reported in 1971 that the 35 mm nitrate film had decomposed.

After Willat's death, his daughter mentioned that she remembered the day when he discovered that Wanderer of the Wasteland had decomposed. She said he went upstairs to his bedroom, closed the door and cried for three hours. His former wife Billie Dove starred in the picture, and he had never really come to terms with their separation. Dove was lured away from Willat by Howard Hughes.

References

External links

 
  Progressive Silent Film List: Wanderer of the Wasteland at silentera.com
 Lobby poster; Wanderer of the Wasteland (flickr)

1924 films
1924 Western (genre) films
1920s color films
1924 lost films
Films based on works by Zane Grey
Films based on American novels
Films based on Western (genre) novels
Films directed by Irvin Willat
Lost Western (genre) films
Silent films in color
Lost American films
Silent American Western (genre) films
1920s English-language films
1920s American films